West Chezzetcook is an Acadian community of the Halifax Regional Municipality in the Canadian province of Nova Scotia on Route 207.

It is the site of the Acadian House Museum.

St. Anselm's Roman Catholic Church
A Roman Catholic church was established in the community in 1814. The present structure was completed in 1894.

References

Explore HRM
Acadian House Museum / L'Acadie de Chezzetcook

Communities in Halifax, Nova Scotia
General Service Areas in Nova Scotia
Acadian history